Amauris crawshayi is a butterfly in the family Nymphalidae. It is found in Cameroon, Angola, the Democratic Republic of the Congo, Uganda, Rwanda, Burundi, Kenya, Tanzania, Malawi and Zambia. The habitat consists of forests.

The larvae feed on Vincetoxicum (syn. Tylophora) (including V. anomala), Marsdenia, Cynanchum, Gymnema and Secamone species.

Subspecies
A. c. crawshayi (northern Malawi, southern and south-eastern Tanzania)
A. c. angola Bethune-Baker, 1914 (Angola)
A. c. camerunica Joicey & Talbot, 1925 (Ghana to Cameroon)
A. c. oscarus Thurau, 1904 (western Kenya, Uganda, Democratic Republic of the Congo, Rwanda, Burundi, north-western Tanzania)
A. c. simulator Talbot, 1926 (Zambia, Democratic Republic of the Congo: south-east to Shaba, Lulua, Maniema)

References

Seitz, A. Die Gross-Schmetterlinge der Erde 13: Die Afrikanischen Tagfalter. Plate XIII 24 ssp. crawshayi and oscarus

Butterflies described in 1897
Amauris
Butterflies of Africa
Taxa named by Arthur Gardiner Butler